Charles Raymond Goodell (1832–1901) was an American civil engineer and architect, prominent in the second half of the 19th century. Two of his works — Evergreen Cemetery and Lincoln Park, both in Portland, Maine — are now on the National Register of Historic Places.

Selected works 
Evergreen Cemetery, Portland, Maine (1855)
Lincoln Park, Portland, Maine (1866)
Eastern Promenade, Portland, Maine (regeneration, 1878)

Personal life
Goodell was married to Susan Watson Anderson (1835–1888).

Gallery

References

External links

19th-century American architects
20th-century American architects
1832 births
1901 deaths